The Men's 3 metre springboard competition at the 1973 World Aquatics Championships was held on 5 and 6 September 1973.

Results
Green denotes finalists

References
Official Results

Men's 3 metre springboard